Arkan is the pseudonym of Željko Ražnatović (1952–2000), Serbian mobster and paramilitary commander.

Arkan may also refer to:
Arkan (dance), dance of the Hutsul people in Ukraine
Arkan a track on the Respublika (Ukrainians album)
Arkan, Iran (disambiguation), several places in Iran
Arkan al-Islam (Five Pillars of Islam)
 9M117M1 Arkan, a variant of 9M117 Bastion Russian anti-tank missile

People with the name 
Seyfi Arkan (1903–1966), Turkish architect
Arkan Simaan (born 1945), Lebanese-born French novelist and historian of science
Arkan Mubayed (born 1983), Syrian footballer

See also 

 Arcan (disambiguation)